Mount Bolton is a locality in western Victoria, Australia. At the 2021 census, Mount Bolton and the surrounding area had a population of 29.

References

Towns in Victoria (Australia)